Tanzania competed in the 2008 Summer Paralympics in Beijing, China. The country's delegation consisted of a single athlete, Ernest Nyabalale. He trained in a Salvation Army facility in Tanzania under Kenyan Solomoni Maswai until a month before the games, on August 14, when he left for Nairobi to train with Kenyan athletes.

Sports

Athletics

See also
Tanzania at the Paralympics
Tanzania at the 2008 Summer Olympics

References

External links
Beijing 2008 Paralympic Games Official Site
International Paralympic Committee

Nations at the 2008 Summer Paralympics
2008
Paralympics